Filothei (Φιλοθέη) can refer to:

Filothei, a municipality in the agglomeration of Athens, Greece
Filothei, Arta, a municipal unit in the regional unit of Arta, Greece
several smaller places in Greece
Saint Philothei